Glenda Hulita Elisabeth Batta (born 19 June 1978), known professionally as Glennis Grace, is a Dutch singer. In 2005, she represented the Netherlands in the 50th edition of the Eurovision Song Contest, and in 2018 she appeared on the 13th season of America's Got Talent and made it to the finals. Glennis Grace has received online attention due to the similarity between her voice and that of Whitney Houston.

Life and career 

Batta was born in Amsterdam to a Dutch mother and a father from Curaçao. She was discovered in 1994, at the age of 15, after she won the Dutch TV talent show called Soundmixshow, where she performed the Whitney Houston song "One Moment in Time".

Eurovision Song Contest 
In 2005, Glennis Grace accepted the offer to participate in the Nationaal Songfestival, the national selection in the Netherlands for the Eurovision Song Contest 2005. Glennis Grace performed the ballad "My Impossible Dream" and won the final with this song. She then represented the Netherlands in Kyiv, but ultimately did not qualify for the final.

In April 2011, she reached the top of the Dutch singles chart with a rendition of "Afscheid", a 1998 hit song of the Dutch band Volumia!, which she sang in the Dutch television program Beste Zangers.

In 2012, Glennis Grace founded the Dutch supergroup Ladies of Soul, together with fellow Dutch artists Candy Dulfer, Berget Lewis, Edsilia Rombley and Trijntje Oosterhuis. Oosterhuis left the group in 2017. 

Glennis Grace was set to perform during the Eurovision Song Contest 2020 in Rotterdam, Netherlands, as an interval act alongside DJ and music producer Afrojack. The event was cancelled due to the COVID-19 pandemic. The performance eventually took place during the rescheduled Eurovision Song Contest 2021, where Grace performed "Titanium", which was co-produced by Afrojack.

America's Got Talent 
Glennis Grace appeared on the 13th season of America's Got Talent in 2018. During the audition rounds (episode: June 27, 2018) Glennis Grace sang Whitney Houston's "Run to You". Glennis Grace received 'Yes' votes from all four judges and went on to the next round, where she performed "Nothing Compares 2 U" from Prince. She received rave reviews from the judges and earned a place in the quarterfinals. In the quarterfinals Glennis Grace sang "Never Enough" from the film The Greatest Showman to reach the semifinals. In the second semifinal, she performed the Kate Bush song "This Woman's Work". This resulted in a spot in the finals together with nine other finalists. In the final she sang the song "Run" from Snow Patrol and got a standing ovation from the judges and the audience. A day later in a separate final broadcast Glennis Grace performed the song "Meant To Be" with American singer Bebe Rexha. She eventually did not make it into the top five finalists.

The Voice of Holland 
In July 2021, it was announced that Glennis Grace would replace Jan Smit as a Coach on the twelfth series of The Voice of Holland. After two audition episodes aired, the series was suspended indefinitely, due to sexual misconduct claims by (former) participants, allegedly going on for years, and aimed at the show's band leader, but also implying lax behavior of some (ex-)coaches.

Arrested for assault

On February 12, 2022, Glennis Grace was arrested along with two other persons, on suspicion of assaulting supermarket employees in Amsterdam. She was kept in custody for three days, after which she was released on February 15, 2022. She was formally charged on February 22, 2022. The same day, two new suspects were arrested.

She was sentenced to 200 hours of community service on November 9, 2022.

Discography

Studio albums

Live

Compilation

Extended plays

Singles

Collaboration

Collaboration: Live

Collaboration: Singles

References

External links
 

https://web.archive.org/web/20070428105747/http://www.esctoday.com/annual/2005/page/15
https://web.archive.org/web/20070930040703/http://www.esctoday.com/news/read/4500?PHPSESSID=34c
https://soundcloud.com/glennisgrace
https://www.nbc.com/americas-got-talent/credits/credit/season-13/glennis-grace

1978 births
Living people
Eurovision Song Contest entrants for the Netherlands
Dutch people of Curaçao descent
Dutch pop singers
Eurovision Song Contest entrants of 2005
Musicians from Amsterdam
Talent show winners
21st-century Dutch singers
21st-century Dutch women singers
Nationaal Songfestival contestants
America's Got Talent contestants